The Minister of Home Affairs is the head of the Ministry of Home Affairs of the Government of Tanzania.

List of ministers
The following have served the ministry:
 Parties

References